Leptocnemis is a genus of narrow-winged damselflies in the family Coenagrionidae. There is one described species in Leptocnemis, L. cyanops.

References

Further reading

 
 
 

Coenagrionidae
Articles created by Qbugbot